Numberjacks is a British computer-animated/live-action children's television series, aimed particularly at children aged two to five, shown regularly on CBeebies and occasionally on BBC Two in the United Kingdom of Great Britain and Northern Ireland. It was also formerly shown on Tiny Pop until the year 2018. It is produced by Open Mind Productions for the BBC and features a mixture of computer-generated animation and live action. 67 episodes were produced. The show focuses on mathematics.

Premise
Numberjacks are a group of anthropomorphic numbers: 0, 1, 2, 3, 4, 5, 6, 7, 8, and 9. Only four of them team up on a mission: Turqouise Five (a female who likes being a numberjack), Yellow Six (who is good with some tricks and jumps), Dark Blue Four (who is a smart one but not quite sure) and Pink Three (a younger one who is cheeky and funny). They go about their everyday lives inside their sofa until a call comes in from real-life child Agents, who report problems that need solving. One or two of the Numberjacks fly out on location to investigate. The Numberjacks have to work out how to put things right, and thwart the dastardly intentions of the five Meanies. After much fun, adventure and powerful thinking, the Numberjacks win the day – until next time.

Characters and voice cast

The Youngest Numberjacks 
 Zero (voiced by Dylan Robertson) - Zero is lime green, has blue eyes, and is the youngest out of the numbers, and does not do much at all. He is a bit special, because he can turn things into nothing, and can line up to make bigger numbers like 10 and 100. He can hardly jump at all, and often falls asleep. He can make things disappear and can make 10 together with One.
 One (voiced by Dylan Robertson) - One is purple. She also has blue eyes, is nice, a bit self-centered and rather immature. She does not jump very much, and is still very much at the centre of her own universe. She is well-meaning, but sometimes the source of the problems, and she can make 10 with Zero at her side.
 Two (voiced by Robert Watson) - Two is orange, quickly flips from one state to the opposite, is busily into things and has a touch of “terrible twos”. Active and changeable, he sometimes wants to be one of the “big numbers”, but is sometimes still very babyish.

The Main Numberjacks 
 Three (voiced by Alice Baker) - Three is pink, has blue eyes, busy, lively, and a bit “Me me me!” but is growing up. Slightly odd and eccentric, noisy, fun and full of herself. She is very keen to be seen as one of the bigger numbers – “I can do it!” – but she is not quite ready for it - yet. A wildly ambitious jumper, Three has a collection of "beautiful things" (which she keeps in a bright red box in the sofa's Cosy Room.) She does not go out on missions in the early episodes, but she graduates to properly doing so later. She is the principal operator of the Brain Gain machine in the sofa's Control Room.
 Four (voiced by Jonathan Beech) - Four is dark blue, has brown eyes, and a regular sort of number – nice, steady, and quite grown up. He is four-square, steady, logical and measured. Not hugely self-confident, he tries not to panic. “I’m not sure, but I’ll try a bit more.” Still happiest at home, not entirely happy as a jumper, but okay as long as things do not go wrong. Four is the mechanic of the Numberjacks, and enjoys fixing things. He likes trains and playing with the Bloop Ball in the Gym. He is the main screen operator and once gets an extra part of body. He looks up to Eight as a big brother and has a special bond with him
 Five (voiced by Laura Maasland) - Five is turquoise, has brown eyes, like Four, is definitely grown up, she is perceptive, sorts things out – quite cool, creative and artistic. She likes looking after the smaller numbers some of the time, especially number 2. Loves jumping, does it with grace and style, outgoing. “I’m fine!” She is a good and cool singer, has a good fashion sense (for someone who never wears clothes). In almost every episode, 5 speculates what else might go wrong, which we see as a 2D animation.
 Six - (voiced by Oliver Keogh) - Six is a yellow and “bigger” number, has blue eyes, like Three, enjoys playing tricks, and is good fun. Quite physical, he is a cool jumper, sometimes a bit too flash for his own good. He tends to be the leader of the Numberjacks, though perhaps not as bright as Five. “Did the trick!” He loves riding in cars. 6 usually decides who will go on the Mission.

The Eldest Numberjacks 
 Seven (voiced by Roz Ellis) - Seven is red, enthusiastic, slightly “new age”, colourful and bright. She has brown eyes, just like Four, is a very good painter, especially of the seven colours of the rainbow. She sings well, is energetic, creative and almost always busy. In the episode "Interesting Times", Numberjack Seven acts as a Narrator.
 Eight - (voiced by Harry Munday) - Eight is sky blue, also has brown eyes, a good jumper, and has a special bond with Four, being looked up to as a sort of big brother. Eight is cheerful, rounded, earthy, sporty, and game, he can go a little to far like when he made Four symmetrical
 Nine - (voiced by Roz Ellis) - Nine is light green, also has brown eyes, and is the “biggest” Numberjack. She is motherly, quite sensible, grown up and neat. She has a particular fondness for Three. She is a good organizer, and calm in a crisis.

The Meanies 
 The Shape Japer (voiced by Rachel Preece) - The Shape Japer is female, the smallest meanie and the second meanie and the first female meanie to appear in the Numberjacks, and often the cause of things changing shape, or particular shapes having problems. She flies though the air, does not speak much, but laughs a lot, sometimes in peoples' faces. She is able to change her shape from sphere to cube instantly and has the most appearance out of the meanies on Numberjacks. Slightly mad and instinctive rather than calculating.
 The Puzzler (voiced by Bob Golding) - The Puzzler is male and the usual cause of things being in the wrong position. He is, of all things, a former DJ, speaks in rhyme, and loves setting up puzzles. He is a floating spherical face, with features that can move around. He is quite intellectual, and is secretly pleased when the Numberjacks solve his puzzles. He sometimes bubbles as he speaks, and can blow giant, orange, poisonous bubbles to trap each of the Numberjacks inside.
 The Problem Blob (vocal effects provided by Bob Golding) - The Problem Blob is male and is the first meanie to appear in the Numberjacks; he is often the cause of things acting strange and not in the ordinary. He spits out many green, small blobs, and whatever does get "blobbed", will begin to cause problems, often completely random. He also has an eye on a stalk that can come out of his mouth at times. The Problem Blob has had the least appearances on Numberjacks. The Numberjacks he had blobbed included Four and Six.
 The Numbertaker (portrayed by Ross Mullan) - The Numbertaker is male, the largest meanie, and always silent. He causes trouble by taking numbers and “numbers of things”. The sleeves of his long with coat hide various attachments – a vacuum-cleaner, a magnet, a net, a hook, and a “number sucker-upper”. There is something of a (rather sinister) street performer about him. He sometimes becomes his alter ego and the "Numbermaker", causing problems by creating numbers and numbers of things. 
 Spooky Spoon (voiced by Rachel Preece) - Spooky Spoon is female, and loves to stir things up and mix them – she is usually the source of problems with matching and connecting. She really fancies herself, thinks herself superior to everyone around her. Very vocal, has a particular dislike for 5, whom she feels is something of a rival.

When a meanie is defeated, the end of their theme song will play; this happens in most episodes, but not all of them.

Episodes
Series 1, consisting of 45 15-minute episodes, first aired in Autumn 2006. Series 2, consisting of 20 15-minute episodes first aired on CBeebies in 2009. 3, 4, 5, and 6 appear in every episode, so they are not included in the "Numberjacks" list

Series overview

Series 1 (2006-2007)

Series 2 (2009)

Awards
 Royal Television Society Educational Television Awards 2006
 Awarded Best Schools Programme – 0–5 Years (for the episode "Nine Lives")
 Royal Television Society Educational Television Awards 2007
 Awarded Best Schools Programme – 0–5 Years (for the episode "Zero the Hero")

UK DVD Releases
The Numberjacks Are On Their Way! (Volume 1)
1. "The Trouble With Nothing"
2. "Going Wrong Going Long"
4. "In, Out, Shake It All About"
10. "4 He's A Jolly Good Fellow"
11. "Boxing Day"
17. "Off Colour"
Calling All Agents! (Volume 2)
3. "Sphere Today, Gone Tomorrow"
5. "One More Time"
8. "Getting Heavy"
13. "Nine Lives"
24. "One Won"
27. "Best Estimate"
Standing By To Zoom! (Volume 3)
6. "Forward Thinking"
7. "Seven Wonders"
9. "Belongings"
18. "A Game Of Two Halves"
29. "Zero The Hero"
33. "Being 3"
Brain Gain! (Volume 4)
14. "Takeaway"
15. "The Cuck-Cuck-Cuck-Oo-Oo-Oo Bird"
19. "Out For The Count"
22. "3 Things Good"
32. "Fair Shares"
44. "Data Day"
Counting Down To Christmas! (Volume 5)
20. "The Container Drainer"
23. "Say What You Mean"
26. "May The Fours Be With You"
37. "Time Trouble"
41. "Two, Four, Six, Eight"
46. "Counting Down to Christmas" (25 minute film, available on DVD and online)
Seaside Adventure (Volume 6)
30. "Bad Circles"
31. "Famous Fives"
34. "Into The Teens"
47. "Seaside Adventure" (45 minute feature available on DVD and online)

References

External links
 Official Numberjacks store UK

2000s British animated television series
2006 British television series debuts
2009 British television series endings
BBC children's television shows
British children's animated comedy television series
British computer-animated television series
British preschool education television series
British television series with live action and animation
Animated preschool education television series
2000s preschool education television series
English-language television shows
CBeebies
Mathematics education television series